Mundial was a Peruvian weekly magazine. It was one of the publications that marked the birth of modern journalism in Peru, both for its graphic design and its content when it appeared in Lima on April 28, 1920. It reached up to number 576, corresponding to 4 September 1931. Its director was Andrés Avelino Aramburú Salinas and it was printed on the site of the “La Opinión Nacional” on Calle Mantas 152.

Further reading
 Basadre, Jorge: Historia de la República del Perú. 1822 - 1933, Octava Edición, corregida y aumentada.Tomo 14, pág. 3462. Editada por el Diario "La República" de Lima y la Universidad "Ricardo Palma". Impreso en Santiago de Chile, 1998.
 Garavito Amézaga, Hugo: Mundial y el periodismo moderno. Publicado en el suplemento dominical de El Comercio. Lima, 11 de diciembre de 1983.
 Tauro del Pino, Alberto: Enciclopedia Ilustrada del Perú. Tercera Edición. Tomo 11. Lima, PEISA, 2001.

External links
Official site

Defunct magazines published in Peru
Magazines established in 1920
Magazines disestablished in 1931
Magazines published in Peru
Spanish-language magazines
Weekly news magazines
Mass media in Lima